Mount Selinda High School is a school located in Manicaland, Zimbabwe.

Notable former students Alex Chigodora and Tonheyi Lovemore, Former junior MP- Josiah Nyamunda, sports woman Irene Bhene.

Chipinge District
Educational institutions established in 1893
High schools in Zimbabwe
1893 establishments in the British Empire
Buildings and structures in Manicaland Province
Education in Manicaland Province